Bedellia minor, the Florida morning-glory leafminer moth, is a moth in the  family Bedelliidae. It is found in Florida in the United States and on Cuba.

The larvae feed on Ipomoea species. They mine the leaves of their host plant.

References

Natural History Museum Lepidoptera generic names catalog

Bedelliidae